Ingénue is the second solo album by Canadian singer k.d. lang, released in 1992. It is Lang's most successful album on the pop charts, both in her native Canada and internationally, and has more of a cabaret flavor than her earlier more country-influenced work.

Singles
"Constant Craving" was the first single released from the album. It peaked at number 8 in Lang's native Canada, number 38 on the US Billboard Hot 100 and number 15 in the UK Singles Chart when re-released, becoming her biggest solo hit single there. "Constant Craving" inspired (albeit subconsciously) The Rolling Stones' 1997 single "Anybody Seen My Baby?", from their Bridges to Babylon album, with the result that the Stones gave writing credits on that song to Lang and her collaborator Ben Mink.

"Miss Chatelaine" was released as the second single from the album. The song's video depicted Lang—who was usually best known for a fairly androgynous appearance—in an exaggeratedly feminine manner, surrounded by bright pastel colours and a profusion of bubbles reminiscent of a performance on The Lawrence Welk Show, complete with an accordion in the instrumentation.

A third single, "The Mind of Love", was also released.

Both "Save Me" and "Still Thrives This Love" were used in the 2003 Showtime film Soldier's Girl.

Critical reception

Ingénue was included in the book 1001 Albums You Must Hear Before You Die.

Track listing
All songs written by k.d. lang and Ben Mink, except where noted.
"Save Me" – 4:33
"The Mind of Love" – 3:48
"Miss Chatelaine" – 3:49
"Wash Me Clean" (Lang) – 3:17
"So It Shall Be" (Lang, Greg Penny) – 4:30
"Still Thrives This Love" – 3:35
"Season of Hollow Soul" – 4:58
"Outside Myself" – 4:57
"Tears of Love's Recall" – 3:49
"Constant Craving" – 4:37

Personnel
k.d. lang – vocals, electric and acoustic guitars, mandolin, tamboura, tambourine, percussion, Tma
Ben Mink – electric and acoustic guitars, bass, viola, violin, percussion, beatboxing
Greg Penny – percussion, beatboxing
Greg Leisz – steel, pedal steel and lap steel guitar
Teddy Borowiecki – keyboards, piano, accordion, santur
David Piltch – acoustic, electric and fretless bass guitar
Randall Stoll – drums
Graham Boyle – percussion, tympani, tambourine
Gary Burton – marimba, vibraphone
Ingrid Friesen, Martin Laba – pizzicato violin
John Friesen – cello
Mryon Schultz – clarinet

Production
Producers: Greg Penny, Ben Mink, k.d. lang
Engineers: Greg Penny, Marc Ramaer, Morrie Eaman, Ben Mink
Assistant engineers: Steve Royea, Louie Teran, Pete Wonsiak
Mixing: Greg Penny, Marc Ramaer
Mixing assistant: Chris Puram
Mastering: Chris Bellman
Programming: Ben Mink, Greg Penny
String arrangements: Ben Mink
Art direction: Jeri Heiden
Design: Jeri Heiden, Greg Ross
Photography: Glen Erler

Accolades

Grammy Awards

|-
|  style="width:35px; text-align:center;" rowspan="5"|1993 ||rowspan="2"|  Ingénue || Album of the Year || 
|-
|Best Engineered Non-classical Album || 
|-
|rowspan="3"|"Constant Craving" || Best Female Pop Vocal Performance || 
|-
| Song of the Year || 
|-
| Record of the Year || 
|-
| style="text-align:center;"| 1994
| style="text-align:left;"|"Miss Chatelaine"
| Best Female Pop Vocal Performance
|

Charts

Weekly charts

Year-end charts

Certifications

References

1992 albums
K.d. lang albums
Sire Records albums
Juno Award for Album of the Year albums
Albums recorded at Greenhouse Studios